Copper Canyon is a 1950 American Technicolor Western film directed by John Farrow and starring Ray Milland and Hedy Lamarr.

Plot
A group of copper miners, Southern veterans, are terrorized by local rebel-haters, led by deputy Lane Travis. The miners ask stage sharpshooter Johnny Carter to help them, under the impression that he is the legendary Colonel Desmond. It seems they're wrong; but Johnny's show comes to Coppertown and Johnny romances lovely gambler Lisa Roselle, who the miners believe is at the center of their troubles.

Cast
Ray Milland as Johnny Carter
Hedy Lamarr as Lisa Roselle
Macdonald Carey as Deputy Lane Travis
Mona Freeman as Caroline Desmond
Harry Carey Jr. as Lt. Ord

Production
Filming began on April 14, 1949 and concluded in early July of that year. Some scenes were shot on location near Sedona, Arizona and at Vasquez Rocks in Chatsworth, Los Angeles. Paramount postponed the release of this film to coincide with the release of the song "Copper Canyon."

Adaptation
The film was adapted to comic book form in Fawcett Comics' Copper Canyon (1950).

References

External links

1950 films
1950 Western (genre) films
American Western (genre) films
Films directed by John Farrow
Films adapted into comics
Films scored by Daniele Amfitheatrof
1950s English-language films
1950s American films